The Belgian Ladies Open is a women's professional golf tournament on the Ladies European Tour held in Belgium. 

The tournament was played annually 1985–1995. It was known as the Godiva Ladies European Masters 1988–1989 and the BMW European Masters 1990–1994. The tournament was slated to return to the LET schedule in 2020 but was cancelled due to the COVID-19 pandemic.

Starting in 2014 Belgium has also hosted the Belgian LETAS Trophy on the LET's development tour.

Winners

Source:

See also
Belgian Open

References

External links
Ladies European Tour

Ladies European Tour events
Golf tournaments in Belgium
Recurring sporting events established in 1985
1985 establishments in Belgium